Rhynchus or Rhynchos was a town of ancient Acarnania near Stratus, of uncertain site.

References

Populated places in ancient Acarnania
Former populated places in Greece
Lost ancient cities and towns